This is a list of airlines currently operating in Georgia.

Scheduled airlines

Cargo airlines

Charter airlines

See also
 List of defunct airlines of Georgia
 List of airlines
 List of defunct airlines of Europe

References

Airlines
Georgia
Airlines
Georgia
Georgia